The String Quartet No. 2 in A minor by Béla Bartók was written between 1915 and October 1917 in Rákoskeresztúr in Hungary. It is one of six string quartets by Bartok.

The work is in three movements:

In a letter to André Gertier, Bartók described the first movement as being in sonata form, the second as "a kind of rondo" and the third as "difficult to define" but possibly a sort of ternary form. Zoltán Kodály, who thought of the three movements of this quartet as "life episodes," heard "peaceful life" in the first movement, and for all its roiling emotions, the movement does indeed leave an impression of tranquility at the end.

The brooding, intense last movement (Kodály heard it as "suffering") is particularly funereal because it is as immobile as the second movement is animated. Long stretches are rhythmically static, and the parts that do move are often interrupted by silence.

The work was dedicated to the Waldbauer-Kerpely Quartet, who gave the piece its premiere on 3 March 1918 in Budapest. The work was first published in 1920 by Universal Edition.

Discography

References

 Bartók Quartet No. 2, lecture by Roger Parker, followed by a performance by the Badke Quartet, Gresham College, 4 December 2007 (available for download as MP3 or MP4, as well as a text document)

External links
 
 Performance by the Borromeo String Quartet from the Isabella Stewart Gardner Museum in MP3 format

2
1917 compositions